Ajay V. Bhatt is an Indian-born American computer architect who defined and developed several widely used technologies, including USB (Universal Serial Bus), Platform Power Management architecture and various chipset improvements.

Early life
After completing his graduation from the Maharaja Sayajirao University of Baroda, India, Ajay V. Bhatt received his master's degree from The City University of New York, United States.

Career
Bhatt joined Intel in 1990 as a senior staff architect on the chipset architecture team in Folsom. He holds one hundred and thirty-two U.S. and international patents, and several others are in various stages of filing. In 1998, 2003 and 2004, Bhatt was nominated to take part in a Distinguished Lecture Series at leading universities in the United States and Asia. He received an Achievement in Excellence Award for his contribution in PCI Express specification development in 2002.

Intel's Chief I/O architect responsible for the platform and I/O interconnects directions, Bhatt also leads definition and development of the next-generation Client Platform architecture.

The October 9, 2009 episode of the late night variety/talk show The Tonight Show with Conan O'Brien included a comedy sketch featuring him that parodied Intel's "Rockstar" commercials. Ajay Bhatt was featured in the July 2010 issue of GQ India, as one of "The 50 Most Influential Global Indians!"

Bhatt was brought greater attention by a 2009 Intel television advertisement in which he was portrayed by actor Sunil Narkar.

Recognition 
 2013 winner of the European Inventor Award in the Non-European countries category
 In April 2013 he was awarded the Outstanding Achievement in Science & Technology Award at The Asian Awards in London.

Further reading 
 USB inventor is tech's unlikely 'rock star', By John D. Sutter, February 4, 2010 – Ajay Bhatt on CNN.COM
 How humble USB turned engineer into tech 'rock star' By Nick Glass and Matthew Knight, CNN

References

External links 

 
 Ajay Bhatt Interview with Conan O'Brien
 Photo at Flickr
 Ajay V.Bhatt winner of the European Inventor Award
 

Living people
21st-century American engineers
21st-century American inventors
American patent holders
City University of New York alumni
20th-century Indian engineers
Indian emigrants to the United States
20th-century Indian inventors
Intel people
Maharaja Sayajirao University of Baroda alumni
USB
1957 births